Hinamutawa Philip is a Papua New Guinean cricketer. She played for the Papua New Guinea women's national cricket team in the 2017 Women's Cricket World Cup Qualifier in February 2017.

References

External links
 

Year of birth missing (living people)
Living people
Papua New Guinean women cricketers
Place of birth missing (living people)